Duke Huai of Jin (died 637BC), personal name Yu, was briefly the duke of Jin (.637BC) during the Spring and Autumn period of the Zhou dynasty.

Life
Yu's father was the future Duke Hui of Jin, who married a princess of Liang during his exile there. Ji became known as  when his father assumed the duchy of Jin. In 643 BC, Prince Yu was sent to the State of Qin as a hostage, where he married Princess Huai Ying (懷嬴), a daughter of Duke Mu of Qin, the powerful ruler of Qin at the time.  In 641 BC, Qin conquered and annexed Liang.

In 638 BC, Duke Hui of Jin became ill.  As Prince Yu was a hostage in Qin and his mother's state had been destroyed, he was worried that Duke Hui might replace him as crown prince with one of his other sons.  He decided to escape back to Jin.  Huai Ying refused to escape with him but agreed not to reveal his plan.

Duke Hui died in the ninth month of 637 BC, and Prince Yu ascended the throne, to be known as Duke Huai of Jin.  Duke Mu of Qin, however, was angry at Prince Yu for his escape from Qin and supported Duke Hui's brother Chong'er.  He even married five of his daughters, including Huai Ying, to Chong'er.  With the support of the Qin army, as well as Jin generals Luan Zhi and Xi Hu (郤縠), Chong'er killed Duke Huai at Gaoliang and ascended the throne as Duke Wen of Jin.

References

Year of birth unknown
Monarchs of Jin (Chinese state)
7th-century BC Chinese monarchs
637 BC deaths
7th-century BC murdered monarchs
Assassinated Chinese politicians